Larry Cannon (April 13, 1937 – November 6, 1995) was an American race car driver.

Born in Danville, Illinois, Cannon also died there in 1995, after suffering an embolism. He drove in the USAC and CART Championship Car series, racing in the 1970-1971 and 1973-1981 seasons, with 44 combined career starts, including the Indianapolis 500 in 1974, 1976, and 1980. He finished in the top ten 7 times, with his best finish in 8th position in 1976 at both College Station and Michigan International Speedway.

Cannon did not qualify for the 1977 Indianapolis 500, but did compete as a relief driver. In the final ten laps, Cannon took over the car of John Mahler, and drove it to the finish. He prided himself as being one of only a handful of drivers to be on the track at the moment A. J. Foyt won his record fourth Indy 500.

For the three times he qualified for the Indianapolis 500 (1974, 1976, 1980), Johnny Rutherford won the race all three times.

He was commonly known by his nickname Larry "Boom Boom" Cannon, and was a barber by trade.

Indianapolis 500 results

References

External links 

1937 births
1995 deaths
Champ Car drivers
Indianapolis 500 drivers
People from Danville, Illinois
Racing drivers from Illinois
Deaths from embolism
USAC Silver Crown Series drivers